The Health and Retirement Study (HRS) is a longitudinal survey of a representative sample of Americans over age 50 conducted by the Survey Research Center (SRC) at the Institute for Social Research (ISR) at the University of Michigan in Ann Arbor and supported by the National Institute on Aging (NIA). The study interviews approximately 20,000 respondents every two years on subjects like health care, housing, assets, pensions, employment and disability. The study is managed through a cooperative agreement (NIA U01AG009740) between the NIA, which provides primary funding, and the ISR, which administers and conducts the survey. Beginning in  2012, HRS began adding genetic information from consenting participants to its database.  The economic measures captured by the data in the HRS are regarded as being of very high quality.

Purpose

The HRS is designed to inform the national retirement discussion as the population ages. The inspiration for the HRS emerged in the mid-1980s, when scientists at NIA and elsewhere recognized the need for a new national survey of America’s expanding older population. By that time, it had become clear that the mainstay of retirement research, the Retirement History Study (RHS), conducted from 1969 to 1979, was no longer adequately addressing contemporary retirement issues. For example, the RHS sample underrepresented women, Blacks, and Hispanics who, by the mid-1980s were a growing part of the labor force. The RHS also did not ask about health or physical or mental function, all of which can affect the decision and ability to retire. Moreover, research on the retirement process was fragmented, with economists, sociologists, psychologists, epidemiologists, demographers, and biomedical researchers proposing and conducting studies within their own "silos," often without regard to the relevant research activities of other disciplines.

Determining that a new approach was needed, an Ad Hoc Advisory Panel was convened by the National Institute on Aging. In early 1988 the panel recommended the initiation of a new, long-term study to examine the ways in which older adults’ changing health interacts with social, economic, and psychological factors and retirement decisions. Government experts and academic researchers from diverse disciplines were recruited to collaboratively create and design the study. Ultimately, relevant executive agencies and the United States Congress recognized the value of this major social science investment, and the HRS was established.

Administrative Information
Many individuals and institutions have contributed to the planning, design, development, and ongoing administration of the study. This includes the study’s leadership at the Institute for Social Research, specifically the first HRS Director, F. Thomas Juster, who led the effort to initiate the HRS, Robert J. Willis, the Director from 1995 to 2007, and David R. Weir, the current Director. HRS relies on the contributions of the HRS co-investigators, a multidisciplinary group of leading academic researchers at the University of Michigan and other institutions nationwide, a steering committee and working groups, which have provided critical advice about the study’s design and monitored its progress, and the NIA-HRS Data Monitoring Committee, an advisory group of independent members of the academic research community and representatives of agencies interested in the study. 

In addition, the Social Security Administration has provided technical advice and substantial support for the study. Over the HRS’s history, other important contributors have included the United States Department of Labor’s Pension and Welfare Benefits Administration, the United States Department of Health and Human Services Office of the Assistant Secretary for Planning and Evaluation, and the State of Florida.

Related Studies
The HRS has a number of sister studies in other countries. In recent years, the HRS has been extended to several Asian countries, including Korea (the Korean Longitudinal Study of Aging or KLoSA), Japan (the Japanese Study of Aging and Retirement or JSTAR), China (the Chinese Health and Retirement Survey or CHARLS), India (The Longitudinal Aging Study in India or LASI) and New Zealand (Health, Work and Retirement Study). Population aging is very rapid in Asia and India and China alone will have more than one billion people over age 60 during this century. CHARLS is headed by a team at the Chinese Center for Economic Research (CCER) at Peking University under the direction of Professor Zhao Yaohui. LASI is jointly headed by a team from Harvard University under the direction of Professor David Bloom and the International Institute of Population Studies (IIPS) in Mumbai India. Both CHARLS and LASI were awarded peer review grants to conduct pilot studies by the National Institute of Aging in the United States. Other studies include:
 English Longitudinal Study of Ageing (ELSA)
 Mexican Health and Aging Study (MHAS)
 Survey of Health, Ageing and Retirement in Europe (SHARE)
 New Zealand Health, Work and Retirement Survey
 Korean Longitudinal Study of Aging
 WHO's Study on Global Ageing and Adult Health (SAGE)
 SHARE Israel
 The Irish LongituDinal Study on Ageing (TILDA)
 Longitudinal Aging Study in India (LASI)
 the Chinese Health and Retirement Survey (CHARLS)
 the Japanese Study of Aging and Retirement (JSTAR)
 the Northern Ireland Cohort for the Longitudinal Study of Ageing (NICOLA)

The Gateway to Global Aging Data, a resource that facilitates the use and harmonization of the different datasets of HRS and sister studies in other countries has been developed with support of the National Institute on Aging, National Institutes of Health (RC2 AG036619-01 and R01 AG030153)

Notes

References
 Sonnega, A., Faul, J., Ofstedal, M.B., Langa, K., Phillips, J., & Weir, D. (2014). Cohort profile: the Health and Retirement Study (HRS). International Journal of Epidemiology, 43, 576-585. doi: 10.1093/ije/dyu067
 .

External links
 Health and Retirement Study

Social research
Retirement in the United States